The San Diego Business Journal is a weekly newspaper in San Diego, California covering local business news. Each week, the San Diego Business Journal examines the economic news, demographics and lifestyle profiles of San Diego, and the many ways that the San Diego economy operates. An emailed daily news update is also available by free subscription.

Regular departments include Up Front, highlighting stories featuring San Diego businesses and their decision-makers; Media & Technology, focusing on changes and innovations in the businesses that serve these fields; Small Business, profiling those smaller businesses moving into the fore; and Investment and Finance, where San Diego’s many public companies are profiled and analyzed. One of the features is The List, which ranks the top businesses in any given industry. Some of the categories include Largest Private Companies, Fastest-Growing Private Companies, Highest Paid Executives, Highest Revenue Generators, Permanent Placement Services List, etc. Each of these surveys is then compiled into the San Diego Business Journal's resource – the annual  Book of Lists.

Reo Carr is the executive editor of the San Diego Business Journal.

History
The San Diego Business Journal was established in 1980. In 1986, American City Business Journals acquired the SDBJ with the purchase of Scripps Howard Business Journals. In 1988, ACBJ sold the Los Angeles and San Diego Business Journals to a group led by Kansas City developer Larry Bridges.

Armon Mills was named publisher in 2004. In August 2016, Huntley Paton was announced as the new publisher and president of the journal, effective September 1, 2016. Barbara Chodos is currently the President & Publisher and George Lurie is Editor in Chief - 2021.

Circulation 

Tabloid: Weekly 
Year Established: 1980 
Audit: ABC, 2004 
Total Circulation: 15,610; Qualified Paid: 8,517 
Qualified Nonpaid: n/a; Non-Qualified: 7,093

Regional editions
It has regional editions in Orange County, the San Fernando Valley, and Los Angeles

 San Diego Business Journal
 San Fernando Business Journal
 Orange County Business Journal
 Los Angeles Business Journal

References

External links

 Official site

Weekly newspapers published in California
Companies based in San Diego